"My Girl" is a song by British ska/pop group Madness from their debut album, One Step Beyond.... It was written by Mike Barson. The song was released as a single on 21 December 1979 and spent 10 weeks on the UK Singles Chart, peaking at number 3.

The song was reissued on 27 July 1992 following the success of the reissued "It Must Be Love". It reached number 27 in the UK Singles Chart.

Song history
The song first made its way into the band's set when they were performing as The Invaders. The first performance of the song came in July 1978, when it was performed by the band at the "Blind Alley Shop" and simply titled "New Song". Barson originally performed lead vocals, and even sang on the demo for the song, having written the song about his then girlfriend, Kerstin Rodgers. However, Suggs took over the vocal duties before long, and sang the album version of the song.

When the group performed the song on Top of the Pops in January 1980, they were the first band of the new decade performing on the TV show.

Music video
The music video for "My Girl" features Madness performing the song at the Dublin Castle pub, London. For the video, the stage was extended especially, in order to ensure that the band could perform comfortably.

Critical reception
Mike Nicholls of Record Mirror noted the contrast between "My Girl" and the band's previous single, "One Step Beyond". He felt "My Girl" to be a "Cockney/Dury-style lament" and "more indicative of the Kilburn and the High Roads side of Madness' sound".

Other versions
A demo version of "My Girl" was released on the B-side of the 12" version of "The Return of the Los Palmas 7", featuring Mike Barson on vocals. In 2006, The Ordinary Boys released a live recording of the song at the Brixton Academy featuring Suggs, as the B-side to their single "Nine-2-Five".

On 2 May 2008, Graham McPherson (Suggs) and Carl Smyth (Chas Smash) performed a new arrangement by Pet Shop Boys live at Heaven in London; they appeared as part of Pet Shop Boys' live set during Can You Bear It?, the benefit evening for Dainton Connell's family. A Pet Shop Boys version of the song appears on the Pet Shop Boys' Christmas EP, along with a remix of the song.

Barson wrote a follow-up song, "My Girl 2", which was recorded by Madness and released as a single in 2012.  Though it contains the phrase "my girl", "My Girl 2" is otherwise musically and lyrically quite distinct from "My Girl".

Appearances
In addition to its single release and appearance on the album One Step Beyond... "My Girl" also appears on the Madness collections Divine Madness (a.k.a. The Heavy Heavy Hits), Complete Madness, It's... Madness, Total Madness and The Business.

Audio Bullys included it on their 2003 installment of the Back to Mine series of 'after hours grooving' DJ mix albums, with Tom Dinsdale referring to it as "Classic Madness", adding "everyone should be able to relate to this tune".

Formats and track listings
These are the formats and track listings of major single releases of "My Girl".

1979 release
7" vinyl single

12" vinyl single

1992 release
7" vinyl single

Chart performance

Certifications and sales

My Guy's Mad at Me

Tracey Ullman covered Madness's "My Girl" in 1984. The title was changed to "My Guy", and the single was titled "My Guy's Mad at Me". Madness' Mark Bedford played bass on the track. Her version was in the UK Top 40 at the same time as Madness' "Michael Caine" and peaked at number 23. The music video featured the British politician Neil Kinnock, at the time the Leader of the Opposition. The single was also released as a 7" picture disc, with a picture of Ullman and Kinnock sitting at a table.

Formats and track listings
7" vinyl single

12" vinyl single

Chart performance

References

External links
 

1979 singles
Madness (band) songs
1984 singles
Tracey Ullman songs
Songs written by Mike Barson
1979 songs
Stiff Records singles
Virgin Records singles
Song recordings produced by Clive Langer
Song recordings produced by Alan Winstanley